Aludar (also Romanized as Ālūdar and Aloodar; also known as Alīdar and ‘Alī Dar) is a village in Sang Sefid Rural District, Qareh Chay District, Khondab County, Markazi Province, Iran. At the 2006 census, its population was 655, with 148 families.

References 

Populated places in Khondab County